Singleton is an outer southern suburb of Perth, the capital city of Western Australia, located within the City of Rockingham. It is the southernmost suburb of the Perth Metropolitan Area and is actually closer to the regional city Mandurah than either Perth CBD or Rockingham. The area is under a development near the school, Singleton Primary, and near the main oval, Laurie Stanford Reserve. There is a petrol service station, a small shopping centre, and a school.

The suburb was named after Captain Francis Singleton, who arrived in the area in 1839 and became a substantial landholder in the area.

References

Suburbs of Perth, Western Australia
Suburbs in the City of Rockingham